Taracus is a genus of harvestman, or Opiliones, typically found living in limestone and lava caves in the United States.

Species include:

 Taracus aspenae Shear, 2018 (Oregon)
 Taracus birsteini Ljovuschkin, 1971 (Russia)
 Taracus audisioae Shear, 2016
 Taracus birsteini Ljovuschkin, 1971
 Taracus carmanah Shear, 2016
 Taracus fluvipileus Shear, 2016
 Taracus gertschi Goodnight &  Goodnight, 1942 (Oregon)
 Taracus malkini Goodnight &  Goodnight, 1945 (California)
 Taracus marchingtoni Shear & Warfel, 2016 (Oregon)
 Taracus nigripes Goodnight &  Goodnight, 1943 (Colorado)
 Taracus packardi Simon, 1879 (Colorado)
 Taracus pallipes Banks, 1894 (Washington)
 Taracus silvestrii Roewer, 1930 (cave in USA)
 Taracus spesavius Shear, 2016
 Taracus spinosus Banks, 1894 (California)
 Taracus taylori Shear, 2016
 Taracus timpanogos Shear, 2016
 Taracus ubicki Shear, 2016

References

Harvestmen
Arthropods of the United States